Wleń  is a small historic town in Lwówek Śląski County, Lower Silesian Voivodeship, in south-western Poland.

The town is the seat of the administrative district (gmina) called Gmina Wleń. , it has a population of 1,759.

Wleń was established in 1214 by the Silesian duke Henry I the Bearded and his wife Hedwig of Andechs, as part of fragmented medieval Poland.

Sights
 
 The ruins of the one of two oldest castles in Poland  with its only remaining tower, are visible from the town. Originally foundation of Silesian Dukes, later property of the Haugwitz noble family, the castle is located in the neighbouring village of Łupki. The castle served to protect the nearby borders with Bohemia and Upper Lusatia and was devastated during the Thirty Years' War. A Baroque palace was rebuilt underneath it. The picture above shows the view of Wleń town from the top of the tower, which currently stands less than half its original height. In 2005, a western portion of one of the castle's outer walls crumbled, forcing the castle to be temporarily closed to tourists. The crumbled section of the outer wall was rebuilt over time using funds from the Polish government and the European Union and completed in 2009.
 Baroque Wleń Palace 
 Neoclassicist Town Hall at the Market Square and the Gothic Revival Saint Nicholas church.

Gallery

References

Cities and towns in Lower Silesian Voivodeship
Lwówek Śląski County